The 2014 Arizona United SC season was the club's first season of existence, playing in the USL Professional Division.

USL Pro 

All times from this point on Mountain Standard Time (UTC−07:00)

Results summary

League results

Standings

U.S. Open Cup

Friendlies

Statistics

Goalkeepers

Transfers

Loan in

Loan out 
None

See also 
 2014 in American soccer
 2014 USL Pro season
 Arizona United SC

References 

2
Arizona United SC
Arizona United SC
Arizona United SC
Arizona United SC